= List of superintendents of the Chin Hills =

The Superintendent of the Chin Hills was a historical title for the administrative officer in charge of the British Chin Hills from 1892-1948. This position was created and maintained under the Chin Hills Regulation 1896.

== Leaders of the Chin Hills ==
Number	Name	Term of Office		Notes
Political Officers of the Chin Hills
1	Bertram S. Carey	1892	1895	
2	H.N. Tuck	1895	1896	
Superintendents/Deputy Commissioners of the Chin Hills
1	E.N. Drury	1896	1906	
2	W. Street	1906	1908	
3	L.E.L. Burne	1908	1910	
4	J.D. Prothero	1910	1913	
5	W.R. Head	1913	1913	
6	L.E.L. Burne	1920	1937	
7	L.B. Naylor	1937	1939	
8	H.J. Mithcell	1939	1940	
9	H.N.C. Stevenson	1940	1943	
10	J. Poonyo	1943	191944	
11	Cooks	1944	1945	
12	Leedhams	1945	1945	
13	De Glandvilles	1945	1946	
14	Thein Maung	1946	1948	

== Sources ==
- Pau, Pum Khan (2019). Indo-Burma Frontier and the Making of the Chin Hills. Taylor & Francis.
- Sakhong, Lian H. (2003). In Search of Chin Identity: A study in Religion, Politics and Ethnic Identity in Burma (PDF). Denmark: NIAS Press. ISBN 87-91114-15-2.
